This is a list of women who served as heads (governors) of Federal subjects of Russia.

History

Of the 85 current heads of federal subjects, one is a woman. This is Natalya Komarova, Governor of Khanty–Mansi Autonomous Okrug since 2010.

List

Italics denotes an acting head of federal subject.

Timeline of female Governors

See also
List of current heads of federal subjects of Russia

References

 
Governors
Russia
 
Russia